The International Society for Krishna Consciousness (ISKCON), known colloquially as the Hare Krishna movement or Hare Krishnas, is a Gaudiya Vaishnava Hindu religious organization. ISKCON was founded in 1966 in New York City by A. C. Bhaktivedanta Swami Prabhupada.

Its core beliefs are based on Hindu scriptures, particularly the Bhagavad Gita and the Bhagavata Purana. ISKCON is "the largest and, arguably, most important branch" of Gaudiya Vaishnava tradition, which has had adherents in India since the early 16th century and American and European devotees since the early 1900s. ISKCON was formed to spread the practice of Bhakti yoga, the practice of love of God in which those involved (bhaktas) dedicate their thoughts and actions towards pleasing Krishna, whom they consider the Supreme Lord. Its most rapid expansion in membership have been within India and (after the collapse of the Soviet Union) in Russia and other formerly Soviet-aligned states of Eastern Europe.

History and belief

ISKCON devotees follow a disciplic line of Brahma Madhva Gaudiya Bhagavata Vaishnavas and are the largest branch of Gaudiya Vaishnavism. Vaishnavism means 'worship of Vishnu', and Gauḍa refers to the area where this particular branch of Vaishnavism originated, in the Gauda region of West Bengal. Gaudiya Vaishnavism has had a following in India, especially West Bengal and Odisha, for the past five hundred years. Gaudiya Vaishnavism was founded by Chaitanya Mahaprabhu a hidden avatar of the Lord who rapidly spread his form of ecstatic bhakti (devotion) throughout Bengal. He established Sankirtan, the practice of publicly expressing devotion to Krishna, the Supreme God, through dance and song. This form of communal worship responded to rigid caste structures by engaging all people in worship regardless of caste and creed. Sri Chaitanya Mahaprabhu emphasized chanting the Hare Krishna Mahamantra (the 'great mantra'). He is considered by Gaudiya Vaishnavas to be an incarnation of Krishna himself.

Bhaktivedanta Swami Prabhupada, believed to have direct lineage with Chaitanya Mahaprabhu, brought Chaitanya's Gaudiya Vaishnavism to the West in 1965. At 70 years old, he landed in New York without any money (40 rupees of Indian currency). Instead of preaching to New York's elite, he tapped into the 1960s countercultural spirit by preaching and chanting in public parks and attracting hippies and the youth. His movement, then known as the "Hare Krishna Movement", grew even larger when he relocated to San Francisco a year later. When it spread to England, it gained publicity and financial backing from the Beatles' George Harrison. He recorded several tracks with the Hare Krishnas and included the Mahamantra in his hit track "My Sweet Lord". The first Hare Krishna commune, New Vrindavan (West Virginia), was established by Prabhupada in 1968. Since then, ISKCON has established more than 800 centers all over the world and has millions of followers.

Key to the spread of Gaudiya Vaishnava theology in the Western world were Prabhupada's writings and translations, including the Bhagavad Gita As It Is, Srimad Bhagavatam (Bhagavata Purana), Chaitanya Charitamrita, and other scriptures. These works are now available in more than seventy languages and serve as the scriptures of ISKCON.

ISKCON describes Krishna as the source of all the avatars of God. Thus ISKCON devotees worship Krishna as the highest form of God, svayam bhagavan, and often refer to him as the Supreme Personality of Godhead in writing, which was a phrase coined by Prabhupada in his books on the subject. To devotees, Radha represents Krishna's divine female counterpart, the original spiritual potency, and the embodiment of divine love. The individual soul is an eternal personal identity which does not ultimately merge into a non-dual consciousness (Brahman) as believed by the monistic (Advaita) schools of Hinduism. Prabhupada most frequently offers Sanatana-dharma and Varnashrama dharma as more accurate names for the religious system which accepts Vedic authority. It is a monotheistic tradition which has its roots in the theistic Vedanta traditions.

Practices 

The most famous and publicly recognizable ISKCON practice is kirtan, a congregational chanting or singing of the Hare Krishna mantra. Kirtan is both a way to express devotion to God and a way to attract newcomers to the movement. Devotees gather in public, in streets and parks, to sing the mantra accompanied by instruments like the mridanga, hand cymbals, and the harmonium. During the 1970s, ISKCON entered the public eye because of this practice. Devotees would sing, distribute books, and proselytize in airports and other public areas, often obtrusively. Sankirtan continues throughout the world today, but in a less confrontational manner.

Other important religious practice within ISKCON and Gaudiya Vaishnavism is japa, or the meditative practice of repeatedly chanting the names of Krishna on a set of prayer beads (similar to a rosary). It is considered the only way for salvation for people in the current age. Prabhupada established a standard for initiated devotees to chant sixteen rounds of the Hare Krishna a day. Each round requires chanting the mahamantra 108 times on prayer beads, with sixteen rounds being 1728 repetitions and taking around two hours.

Another important practice in ISKCON is arati (also called puja). In arati, devotees offer water, incense, a fire lamp, and flowers to a murti, a sacred statue or image of Krishna. This is accompanied by prayers and devotional songs called bhajans. Practitioners may perform arati at their own home or congregate at a temple to join in the ceremony. Along with this worship, devotees will bathe the murti, dress it, offer it food, and even put it to sleep. By doing arati and serving the murti, devotees aim to deepen their relationship with Krishna.

ISKCON devotees meet regularly (typically on Sunday at a program known as the Sunday Feast) to worship deities, listen to discourses by senior devotees, participate in kirtan and eat sanctified offered food. Devotees place great emphasis on listening to spiritual discourses, believing them to be a key role in spiritual advancement.

Four Regulative Principles 
During initiation (diksha) ISKCON devotees vow to follow four basic rules and regulations. They are as follows: 
 to follow a lacto-vegetarian diet
 to not consume any intoxicants (alcohol, cigarettes or drugs) 
 to not gamble 
 to not engage in 'illicit sex'

Festivals 

Besides weekly gatherings, devotees within the ISKCON movement celebrate a diverse array of Hindu festivals, including Janmashtami, Radhastami, Diwali, Gaura Purnima, Ekadasi, Holi, Rama Navami, and Gita Jayanti.

The Ratha Yatra Festival of Chariots is an annual parade whereby devotees chant and dance on the street, pulling a chariot with the deities of Jagannatha, Baladeva, and Subhadra behind them. This public procession is typically followed by performances and free vegetarian food.

Preaching 
ISKCON advocates preaching. Members try to spread Krishna consciousness primarily by singing the Hare Krishna mantra in public places and by selling books written by the founder.

A study conducted by E. Burke Rochford Jr. at the University of California found that there are four types of contact between those in ISKCON and prospective members: individually motivated contact, contact made with members in public areas, contact made through personal connections, and contact with sympathizers of the movement who strongly encourage people to join.

According to the doctrine of Chaitanya Mahaprabhu, one does not need to be born in a Hindu family to take up the practice.

Management structure
 
Prabhupada spent much of the last decade of his life setting up the institution of ISKCON.

The Governing Body Commission (or GBC) is the managerial authority of ISKCON. Created by Bhaktivedanta in 1970 it meets annually. In a document Direction of Management written on 28 July 1970 Prabhupada appointed twelve members to the commission, all of them non-sannyasi, including Satsvarupa dasa Goswami, Hansadutta Swami, and Tamala Krishna Goswami. The letter outlined the purposes of the commission: improving the standard of temple management, the spread of Krishna consciousness, the distribution of books and literature, the opening of new centers and the education of the devotees. GBC has since grown in size to include 48 senior members from the movement who make decisions based on consensus of opinion.

Shortly after establishing the GBC, Prabhupada asked his newly appointed leaders to renounce the everyday world and become sannyasis (renunciate monks), indicating that those who set policy would not be involved with financial dealings.  However, after Prabhupada's death some GBC members adopted lavish lifestyles. A number of schisms tested the notion of the supreme authority of the GBC. Some of these scandals involved GBC members Hans Kary (Hansadutta) and James Immel (Jayatirtha), as well as one of the leaders of the New Vrindaban community, Keith Ham (Kirtanananda), who surrounded himself with opulence and declared himself the only true successor to Prabhupada.

In 1982, the GBC began the slow process of adding new gurus to the original eleven. In 1983 the GBC was announced to be the highest ecclesiastical authority of ISKCON. In 1985 the decision was made to lower the standard of living for ISKCON leadership. After much heated discussion, the GBC decided to "relieve" a number of leaders and new leaders were selected. The young leaders of the GBC sought the advice of one of Prabhupada's Gaudiya Math godbrothers, and endeavored to become more integrated in the broader Hindu community.

After years of discussion and reforms, a general consensus emerged to accept women as leaders in ISKCON, overriding the former GBC supposition that "unprotected, 'women leaders become subject to various forms of mistreatment and abuse'". In 1998 Malati Devi Dasi became the first woman appointed to the GBC.  The second woman leader, Dina Sharana, was selected in 2009.

Succession of teachings

Prabhupada claimed to belong to the traditional system of paramparā, or disciplic succession, in which teachings upheld by scriptures are handed down from master to disciple, generation after generation.

Women's role 
Women's roles are a controversial issue within ISKCON, and its members have strongly divergent opinions regarding the interpretation of Prabhupada's teachings on gender roles. While some of its leaders advocate that women should take public leadership roles, other leaders disagree, and maintain that "traditional" roles for women are more appropriate. They fear an undesirable influence of secular feminism within ISKCON.

Prabhupada in his original writings encouraged the complete equality of women in the eye of Krishna based on the teachings of Bhagavad Gita that soul does not have any gender and everybody is eligible for spiritual liberation.

Since mother is the most respected position in Vedic culture, women within the Hare Krishna community are all viewed as mothers, especially by celibate male members brahmacharis. "Mother is a term of respect for women in ISKCON, and is often prefixed to the Sanskrit name they receive in initiation. Even unmarried women are referred to as mothers".

After years of discussion and reforms, a general consensus emerged to accept women as leaders and initiators in ISKCON. In 1998 Malati Devi Dasi became the first woman appointed to the GBC.  The second woman leader, Dina Sharana, was selected in 2009.

An updated document was released by the GBC in 2019 stating that it was permissible for women to become initiating gurus within the ISKCON movement.

The ministry was developed to account for the growing interest of female devotees to partake in temple practices and ensure representation in decision making.

Child protection office 
In 1998, ISKCON published an exposé of widespread physical, emotional and sexual abuse of children in the group's boarding schools in the United States and India in the 1970s and 1980s. The Hare Krishna monks and young devotees caring for the children had no training in the task and often resented having to perform it, the report said. At a meeting in 1996, former Krishna pupils testified that they had been regularly beaten at school, denied medical care, and sexually molested and raped.

In 2002 a suit for $900 million was filed in Texas State Court by alleged victims of abuse in ISCKON boarding schools. ISKCON had to later file for Chapter 11 bankruptcy protection. Known as the Turley Case, the eventual 2008 settlement was $15 million.

The ISKCON Central Office of Child Protection was established by the GBC in 1997, and in 2005, released its first official Child Protection Policy and Procedure Guidelines. The CPO has provided Child Protection Information Training to over 500 child care providers within the organization internationally and continues to file and review reports on local Child Protection Teams. The Child Protection Policy and Procedure Guidelines was revised and ratified by the GBC in June 2018.

Kirtan and music influence 

The practice of mantra meditation, also known as kirtan, is prominent in the ISKCON movement. Dedicated kirtan festivals are held annually around the world, such as the Sadhu Sanga Retreat in Boone, North Carolina, Kirtan 50 in Dallas, Texas, and Radhadesh Mellows, in Durbuy, Belgium. Notable kirtaneers include Jahnavi Harrison, Gaura Vani, and the Mayapuris, who have all released kirtan albums. Kirtan sessions are also held outside of temple settings, including at a  local university "Bhakti Clubs", mantra lounges, and at a yoga and wellness festivals.

Full theatrical performances have been produced based on the Vedic theologies. Prominent performance companies include Viva Kultura and Vande Arts.

The Hare Krishna mantra appears in some famous songs, such as former Beatle George Harrison's 1970 hit "My Sweet Lord". John Lennon included the phrase "Hare Krishna" in his lyrics to "Give Peace a Chance" and the Beatles' 1967 track "I Am the Walrus". The backing vocalists also sing the phrase in Ringo Starr's 1971 hit "It Don't Come Easy", written with the help of Harrison, although the words were mixed low on the released version.

Of the four Beatles, only Harrison fully embraced Krishna Consciousness. He also provided financial support for ISKCON's UK branch and in 1973 purchased Bhaktivedanta Manor for their temple compound. Harrison enjoyed a warm friendship with Prabhupada, who provided the inspiration for Harrison songs such as "Living in the Material World".

In the 1980s underground New York City hardcore punk band the Cro-Mags included Hare Krishna members and made references to Krishna Consciousness. By the early 1990s, an entire underground Krishnacore subgenre was established with other New York hardcore bands like Shelter and 108.

In 2020, Willow Smith and Jahnavi Harrison collaborated on the song "Surrender (Krishna Keshava"), and the album "RISE", featuring ancient sacred songs from India with Sanskrit lyrics.

Vegetarianism 
Vegetarianism is one of the four tenets of ISKCON. Due to Prabhupada's focus on food distribution, many ISKCON devotees have opened vegan and vegetarian eateries. Not all restaurants opened by ISKCON members are officially affiliated with ISKCON, although many Govindas’ restaurants or catering businesses operate out of the main temple center.

The Hare Krishna followers call their type or style of eating behaviour as 'Krishnatarian'. According to them  "A Krishnatarian meal is one which is cooked using fresh, vegetarian ingredients (sans onion, garlic, red lentils or mushrooms) and milk products which is cooked by a Krishna conscious individual who cooks for devotion instead of for profit, and offered to Krishna before it is distributed or consumed by an individual."

Demographics
ISKCON claims to have around one million congregational members worldwide (majority in India), with 15,000 in Great Britain.

In the West it "has a relatively small number of followers", estimated at "a few thousand full-time practitioners", but those showing interest in its activities might number into the "tens of thousands."

After knowing success in the West due to the counterculture of the 1960s, ISKCON has lost is momentum from the early 1980s onward, "facing a sharp decline in membership and in financial resources" in North America and in Western Europe, while in the late 1990s the situation began to deteriorate in Eastern Europe as well, and it was estimated that in 2000 only 750-900 members were residing in ISKCON centers in the United States. Since then, the ISKCON has depended on the Indian diaspora to "revitalize" the movement, in most North American congregations Indian members making up 80% of the numbers.

Controversies 
ISKCON has experienced a number of significant internal problems, the majority of which occurred from the late 1970s onwards, and especially within the decade following Bhaktivedanta Swami Prabhupada's death. ISKCON has also been scrutinised by some anti-cult movements.
 In a 1976 case, People vs. Murphy, a criminal trial court in Queens County, New York held that "'[T]he Hare Krishna religion is a bona fide religion with roots in India that go back thousands of years." In that case, a grand jury indicted Iskcon, Inc. and the president of an ISKCON temple for the crime of unlawful imprisonment in the first degree.  Although the parents of two Hare Krishna members claimed ISKCON had allegedly imprisoned their children through brainwashing, Justice John J. Leahy dismissed the criminal indictments on the basis that the two members had freely followed the tenets of their chosen faith.
 In a 1984 case, George v. International Society for Krishna Consciousness of California, a lawsuit that led to lengthy appeals resulting in a mixed judgment. In that case, Marcia and Robin George, a mother and daughter, accused ISKCON of kidnapping Robin via brainwashing and later lying to her parents about her whereabouts. They sued ISKCON for (a) false imprisonment, (b) intentional infliction of emotional distress, (c) libel, and (d) the wrongful death of Robin's father based on stress caused by the alleged circumstances. A California state appellate court dismissed Robin's claims for false imprisonment and intentional infliction of emotional distress on the basis that she was not brainwashed, but rather was "a bright and gifted high school student of above-average intelligence and maturity" who was "capable of consenting" to her travels with her purported kidnappers.  On the other hand, the same appellate court affirmed the jury verdicts holding ISKCON liable for intentional infliction of emotional distress against Marcia and wrongful death because the defendants had deliberately lied to Robin's parents about her location while actively assisting Robin in her travels.  The court also dismissed Robin's libel claim while affirming the jury verdict of libel in favor of Marcia.
 Kirtanananda Swami, or Swami Bhaktipada, a leader of ISKCON, was expelled from the organisation in 1987 for various deviations. He was the leader of New Vrindaban, the largest and most famous Hare Krishna community in the United States at that time. In 1996 Kirtanananda pleaded guilty to one count of racketeering and after serving 8 years of a 20-year prison sentence was subsequently released in 2004. Previously in 1991 the jury had found him guilty of racketeering and mail fraud. These convictions were later overturned on appeal, only to result in the later retrial.
 In the 1990s ISKCON faced accusations of child abuse, and its leaders acknowledged physical, emotional and sexual abuse of children who were sent to live in the rural communities' boarding schools in the United States and India in the 1970s and 1980s. 

Sociologist of religion E. Burke Rochford argues that a culture of abuse in ISKCON schools arose in part because of renunciant leaders' subtle denigration of the value of householders and children.  Several safety regulations and subcommittees, such as ISKCON Resolve and the ISKCON Child Protection Office, have been developed since these allegations to ensure that legal rights as well as the health and safety of devotees.

Persecution
In 2006, a bomb blast struck the ISKCON temple in Imphal in Manipur, India. Five devotees were killed and a further 50 were injured. The attack was not claimed by any individual or organization.
In 2007, the Kazakhstan government authorities demolished 25 homes belonging to the ISKCON members in Sri Vrindavan Dham commune in Almaty, on the grounds that they were illegal constructions.
In 2009, an orphanage run by the ISKCON Chittagong (Sri Sri Radha Madhava Mandir) in Bangladesh was attacked by unknown men. The gang vandalised furniture and a statue in the orphanage and beat the devotees. They also tried to take control of the temple and the orphanage.
In 2015, the ISKCON Temple, Dinajpur in Bangladesh was attacked by Jamaat-ul-Mujahideen Bangladesh terrorists. The terrorists opened fire and at least two people were injured in the attack.
In 2016, the ISKCON Sylhet in Bangladesh was attacked by Muslims and at least ten people were injured in that attack.
In 2018, the gate of the ISKCON Temple in Curitiba, Brazil was targeted by unknown perpetrators. The painting of Krishna with his mother Yashoda was defaced.
In 2018, Rath Yatra organised by ISKCON Dhaka in Bangladesh was attacked by a group of people, leaving six devotees injured.
In 2020, an Ansar al-Islam group planned an attack on the ISKCON Temple Dhaka but police arrested them.
In 2021, during Navami (15 October), a Muslim Mob attacked the ISKCON temple in Noakhali, Bangladesh and killed two devotees.

Centers worldwide

India 
India has the highest density of ISKCON centers in the world, with over 800 temples, 12 state-recognized educational institutions, 25 affiliated and non-affiliated restaurants, and a number of tourist and pilgrimage hotels. ISKCON India disciples are more conservative than the ISKCON disciples in the west.

Mayapur Chandrodaya Mandir of the Vedic Planetarium, Mayapur

Set to be completed in 2024, the Temple of the Vedic Planetarium, Mayapur in West Bengal is built in the birthplace of Sri Chaitanya Mahaprabhu, the founder of the Gaudiya-Vaishnava lineage of Hinduism. The temple itself currently sits at 425 000 square feet and is 340 feet tall, and is surrounded by accompanying lodges, shops, residences, educational centers, and gardens. The project cost an estimated $75 million, with its major investor being Alfred B. Ford, the great-grandson of Henry Ford. The complex has a planetarium based on Vedic cosmology and exhibitions about the Vedic arts, sciences, and culture as described in the Srimad Bhagavatam.

Sri Krishna-Balaram Mandir, Vrindavan

Located in the Raman Reti area of Vrindavan, Uttar Pradesh, the Sri Krishna Balaram Mandir temple was built in the original village where the spiritual figures Krishna and Balarama are said to have resided in the Vedic period of Indian history. It is built in close proximity to other holy sites such as the village of Gokul, Govardhana Hill, the Mathura palace, and various holy lakes. As a result, ISKCON Vrindavan is a common pilgrimage site for followers of the Krishna Conscious movement. The complex is home to a guesthouse, a museum, gift shops, a restaurant, a bakery, a broadcast studio as well as a marble temple hall. The temple is also affiliated with the Vrindavan Institute of Higher Education.

Vrindavan Chandrodaya Mandir
In March 2014, the project was inaugurated, and on 16 November 2014, the foundation stone of the temple was laid. Overseen by ISKCON Bangalore, the Vrindavan Chandrodaya Mandir temple building is currently under construction.

Radha Parthasarathi Mandir, New Delhi

The Sri Sri Radha Parthasarathi Mandir temple complex houses the Glory of India Vedic Cultural center, which is a set of  interactive educational exhibits, as well as the world's largest printed religious book, known as the "Astounding Bhagavad Gita". It is located in East of Kailash in South Delhi.

Radha Krishna Mandir, Chennai

The Chennai temple is located on the East Coast Road in southern part of the city. Built on 1.5 acres of land and consecrated in 2012, the temple is the largest Radha Krishna temple in Tamil Nadu.

Radha Krishna Mandir, Salem 
The Salem temple, also known as the Sri Sri Radha Krishna Mandir, is located on Karuppur, Salem. Built on 1.5 acres of land, the temple is one of the Radha Krishna temple in Tamil Nadu. It was formally inaugurated in October 2019.

Radha Madhav Sundar Mandir, Siliguri

Sri Sri Radha Madhav Sundar Mandir is located at Siliguri, West Bengal and known as Gupta Nabadweep Dham.

Nepal 
ISKCON Temple Nepal or ISKCON Nepal is located in Kathmandu. The geographic coordinates of ISKCON Nepal are 27.784062° or (27°47'2.62") of North and 85.356938° or (85°21'24.98") of East. It is on the lap of Shivapuri Mountain where the Holy Bishnumati River flows.

In this temple, the Deities of Sri Sri Radha Govinda Hari (Radha & Krishna), Jagannath, Baladeva, Subhadra, Gaur Nitai, Narasimha are worshiped. ISKCON Nepal celebrates Jagannath Rath Yatra every year. As per a 2018 estimate, over 5000 devotees participate in the ratha yatra from across the globe.

Europe 

There are over 135 ISKCON-affiliated temples and cultural centers in Europe. The ISKCON movement in Europe is home to a number of rural and farming communities, including Nueva Vrajamandala in Spain, La Nouvelle Mayapura in France, and Villa Vrindavan in Italy.

There are also 31 additional centers in Russia, as Vaishnava Hinduism represents one of the largest denominations  of faith in the country.

Radhadesh, Belgium

The Radhadesh temple in Durbuy, Belgium, is home to Bhaktivedanta College, which opened in 2002 to provide ministerial and spiritual education for students, offering degrees and certificates online and on-campus in Vaishnava theology externally validated by the University of Chester.The Radhadesh temple is also home to Radhadesh Mellows, an annual kirtan retreat.

Bhaktivedanta Manor, Watford

A landscaped property featuring gardens, lakes, a school, farm, numerous temple and housing buildings, accommodations, and a bakery. The property for Bhaktivedanta Manor was donated by George Harrison of the Beatles and is on the National Heritage List for England. The houses on the property, including the temple, are built in the mock-Tudor mansion style of the 1800s.

Bhaktivedanta Manor is also home to the London College of Vedic Studies, and is the birthplace of the Avanti Schools Trust, a sponsor of state-funded primary and secondary schools that provides both non-denominational and Hindu-faith education throughout the UK.

Demographically, the majority of devotees in Europe are ethnic Europeans. An exception can be made with the demographics of devotees in the United Kingdom, which caters to the Indian immigrant population, mirroring the demographics of most North American centers.

North and South America 

There are 56 formally affiliated ISKCON centers in the United States. Notable centers include Sri Sri Radha Krishna Temple (Spanish Fork), Utah, New Raman Reti in Alachua, FL, and The Radha Kalachandji Temple in Dallas, TX. Hare Krishna-affiliated full-time communities include New Vrindaban in West Virginia, and Gita Nagari Eco Farm and Sanctuary in Pennsylvania. There are various other centers in the United States that promote Krishna Conscious culture without being formally affiliated with ISKCON, including The Bhakti Center in New York City. The ISKCON Dallas temple is affiliated with the nearby TKG Academy, which provides private school academic education with additional Vedic-based courses.

There are 12 ISKCON centers in Canada, including the self-sustaining Saranagati Eco Village in BC. There are 5 formally affiliated ISKCON centers in Mexico.

There are 60 affiliated ISKCON temples in South America, with most congregations located in Argentina and Brazil. There are also a number of devotee-run farming communities throughout Latin America. Most notable is the eco-village "Nova Gokula" at Pindamonhangaba in the Brazil state of São Paulo, founded in 1978, with two temples planning as traditional Hindu architecture.

Asia, Africa, and Australasia 

Asia is home to over 80 ISKCON affiliated centers, with most being located in Indonesia, Malaysia, and the Philippines.

There are 69 affiliated ISKCON centers in Africa, four of which are rural farming communities and three of which are educational centers. ISKCON Durban hosts the world's largest Ratha Yatra Chariot Festival outside of India.

There are six ISKCON centers, including one farming village in Australia and four temple centers in New Zealand. The Hare Krishna Temple in Christchurch, New Zealand, distributed free meals to mourners and the local Muslim community after a mosque shooting in March 2019.

Subsidiaries

Bhaktivedanta Book Trust
Bhaktivedanta Book Trust (BBT) is a nonprofit organization, of ISKCON, and supplies books both to ISKCON and to the book trade in general. BBT is the publisher of books on the Gaudiya Vaishnava. BBT was established in 1972 by A. C. Bhaktivedanta as the publisher for his books and for books by other authors. It also publishes the magazine Back to Godhead in multiple languages. Apart from the BBT's work in publishing, it helps finance the construction and renovation of Krishna temples in the Gaudiya Vaishnava holy places like Vrindavan and Mayapur.

Cow protection and ISCOWP 
ISCOWP (International Society for Cow Protection) claims to "present alternatives to agricultural and dietary practices that support and depend upon the meat and dairy industries’ slaughter of the cow".

ISKCON Tribal Care Trust 
ISKCON Tribal Care Trust (ITCT) is an affiliate targeting the tribal people. The trust has set up schools and potable water sources for the tribal people.

Pandava Sena

Based out of Bhaktivedanta Manor of Watford UK, Pandava Sena is a youth organization started in 1994. It is composed of professionals and university students that host annual international mentorship and reunion retreats and weekly social gatherings.

Pandava Sena has also established "KCSocs" or "Krishna Conscious Societies" across 30 universities in the UK. Many universities have similar student groups featuring youth from local ISKCON temples.

Notable people 

 Russell Brand
 George Harrison
 Poly Styrene

See also 
 Hare Krsna TV
 Hare Krishna in popular culture
 Krishna valley, Hungary

References

Sources

External links

 

 
  

 
Hindu denominations
Hindu organizations
Hindu new religious movements
Hinduism-related controversies
Hinduism in Australia
Hinduism in India
Hinduism in the United States
International Hindu organizations
Hindu religious orders
Hindu organisations based in India
Hindu temples in California
Palms, Los Angeles
Hinduism in New York (state)
Religious organizations established in 1966
1966 establishments in New York City
Hindu organizations established in the 20th century
Monotheistic religions
Vaishnava sects